John King Stack Jr. (February 13, 1884January 18, 1935) was a Michigan politician who served as Michigan Auditor General from 1933 to 1935.

Early life 
Stack was born on February 13, 1884, in Escanaba, Michigan, to John King and Jane Ann Stack.

Political career
In 1928, Stack was an alternate delegate to the Democratic National Convention from Michigan. In 1930, Stack unsuccessfully ran for the position of Michigan Auditor General. He ran successfully for the same position in 1933. Stack unsuccessfully ran in the Democratic primary for the Governor of Michigan in 1934.

Death
Stack died in office on January 18, 1935. Stack is interred in the Holy Cross Cemetery in Escanaba.

References

1884 births
1935 deaths
People from Escanaba, Michigan
Michigan Auditors General
Michigan Democrats
Burials in Michigan
20th-century American politicians